Benjamin Norris is the name of:

Frank Norris (Benjamin Franklin Norris, 1870–1902), American novelist writing predominantly in the naturalist genre
Benjamin White Norris (1819–1873), U.S. Representative from Alabama
Ben Norris (artist) (1910–2006), painter
Ben Norris (comedian), British stand-up comedian